Benoît Potterie (born 23 July 1967) is a French optician and politician of La République En Marche! (LREM) who served as a member of the National Assembly of France from 2017 to 2022, representing the department of Pas-de-Calais.

Political career
In parliament, Potterie served as member of the Committee on Economic Affairs (2017-2019) and the Finance Committee (2019-2020) before moving to the Cultural and Education Affairs Committee. In addition to his committee assignments, he was part of the French-Albanian Parliamentary Friendship Group and the French Parliamentary Friendship Group with Bosnia and Herzegovina.

In 2019, Potterie was one of only nine LREM members who voted against his parliamentary group's majority and opposed the French ratification of the European Union’s Comprehensive Economic and Trade Agreement (CETA) with Canada. In 2020, Potterie joined the Agir party's parliamentary group.

In the 2022 French legislative election, he stood as a Horizons (Ensemble) candidate. He lost his seat in the first round.

See also
 2017 French legislative election

References

1967 births
Living people
Deputies of the 15th National Assembly of the French Fifth Republic
La République En Marche! politicians
Place of birth missing (living people)
Members of Parliament for Pas-de-Calais
People from Calais
21st-century French politicians
Agir (France) politicians